Edward Johnson is an English actor.

Biography
Edward trained at the Central School of Speech and Drama. He has appeared in numerous stage roles including Jesus in Jesus Christ Superstar. He is a trained horseman. Edward keeps wolves at his home.

Edward lives in Hertfordshire with his wife and son, born 2009.

Television work
EastEnders (2007)
The Bill

Filmography
 Shakespeare in Love (1998)
 I of the Lost (2010)

Notes

English male film actors
English male television actors
English male stage actors
Living people
Year of birth missing (living people)